Churchill station is a railway station in Churchill, Manitoba, Canada. It is served by passenger service Via Rail as well as the Hudson Bay Railway freight carrier. It also has Parks Canada exhibits inside.

The railway to Churchill was originally built by the Canadian National and completed in 1929. The building contains elements of the Queen Anne Revival and the Arts and Crafts styles. The Churchill railway station has been a national heritage railway station since 1992, and has been restored to its former design by the federal government.

The Canadian Government has also recognized the station as a "Recognized Federal Heritage Building" since June 2000. The station building now includes a museum as well as telephones, washrooms and a ticket office which is open one hour prior to departure of the train.

Churchill station is one of only two train stations in Canada bordering on Hudson Bay. The other is Moosonee station, located several hundred kilometers to the southeast on the Moose River south of James Bay (the southernmost part of Hudson Bay) in northern Ontario.

Service interruption
Following extensive flood damage to the Hudson Bay Railway in May 2017, no passenger trains ran to Churchill until December 2018.

See also 
 Churchill Airport 
 Port of Churchill
 List of designated heritage railway stations of Canada

References

External links

World of Stock photo of Churchill station
Via Rail Station Information
Government of Manitoba Regional Map

Via Rail stations in Manitoba
Designated Heritage Railway Stations in Manitoba
Railway stations in Canada opened in 1929
1929 establishments in Manitoba
Buildings and structures in Churchill, Manitoba